Qaidi is a 1957 Bollywood film starring Suresh, Padmini, Ragini, Johnny Walker. The music was composed by O. P. Nayyar.

The film was dubbed into Tamil with the title Magudam Katha Mangai and released in 1957. K. V. Mahadevan composed the music for the Tamil version. A. Maruthakasi wrote the lyrics.

Plot
Laila's greedy father Jabir takes her to Samarna to separate her from handsome, young good-for-nothing Murad.  Murad, who is deeply in love with dancer Laila follows her there.

Laila and her people help the villainous Anwar kidnap his cousin the Crown Prince just before the Royal Coronation. Believing that the Prince has been murdered, Anwar rejoices that he will soon be King. However, the Wazir is worried. He sends his trusted men, Shiraji and Abul Hassan to look for the Prince. While they are searching, they encounter Murad, who strongly resembles the Prince. They persuade Murad to disguise himself as the Prince until the real Prince is located.  Murad is then escorted to the palace. Anwar is shocked to see his plans go down the drain. The Coronation takes place as planned. Afterward, Murad's true identity is revealed and Anwar's hopes are rekindled. Anwar challenges Murad to a duel, hoping to kill his rival, but Murad fights skilfully, leaving Anwar gravely wounded. Amid this scene, the real Prince enters the room. He reveals his how his lookalike Murad had cleverly won over Laila to save the Prince, and how he had escaped to Baghdad.  Anwar succumbs to his injuries. The Prince is crowned. Murad and Laila marry and live happily ever after.

Cast
 Suresh as Murad/ Crown Prince
 Padmini as Laila
 Ragini as Laila's friend
 Johnny Walker as a tramp
 Agha as Abul Hassan

Music
The songs for this film were composed by O. P. Nayyar. The lyrics were penned by Sahir Ludhianvi.
The song "Dekh Li Teri Adaa" by Shamsad Begum was a chartbuster.

Tamil Songs
All the songs in Tamil were composed by K. V. Mahadevan and lyrics were penned by A. Maruthakasi. Playback singers are T. A. Mothi, Jikki & K. Jamuna Rani.

References

External links

Films scored by O. P. Nayyar
1957 films
1950s Hindi-language films
Indian drama films